Abdulaziz II may refer to: 

 Abu Faris Abd al-Aziz II (reigned 1394–1434), Hafsid Caliph of Ifriqiya
 Mehmed Abdulaziz or Abdulaziz II (1901–1977), 40th Head of the Ottoman Dynasty